María Eugenia Bozzoli (also, María Eugenia Bozzoli Vargas and María Eugenia Bozzoli de Wille; born 26 May 1935, in San Marcos de Tarrazú) is a Costa Rican anthropologist, sociologist and human rights activist. She is one of the founders of anthropology in Costa Rica, as well as the country's first woman anthropologist.

Early years and education
Born in San Marcos de Tarrazú on 26 May 1935, Bozzoli is the daughter of Benilda Vargas Blanco and Fermin Bozzoli Zúñiga. She matriculated from San José's  in 1952. Bozzoli lived in the U.S. state of Kansas for six years in the 1950s during her studies at the University of Kansas (Bachelor's Degree, archaeology; Master's Degree, archaeology).

Career
In 1959, Bozzoli became a professor of cultural anthropology at the University of Costa Rica. The Society for Applied Anthropology, states that she is "known for her defense of the rights of ethnic minorities, her efforts for the recognition, respect and tolerance of cultural diversity, and her advocacy for conservation and sustainable use of the natural environment". Her work has concentrated on investigating the cultural history of the Amerindian indigenous population, and looking for alternatives for national development by studying diversity in her country's past. She is particularly adept at understanding social issues facing her country's indigenous people. As a result, during the course of her career, she has worked with numerous government institutions, including the social welfare institute, the electricity institute regarding issues of resettlement with dam building projects, and the Ministry of Natural Resources to ensure sustainable development in Costa Rica.

Bozzoli earned a Ph.D. in anthropology at the University of Georgia in 1975. Thereafter, she served as Director of the Council and as Vice President of Social Action at the University of Costa Rica (1976–1981). and authored Birth and Death in the Belief System of the Bribri Indians of Costa Rica (1979). In 1981, Bozzoli was awarded a Fulbright fellowship and taught at Louisiana State University. In 1962 Bozzoli began teaching at the Universidad de Costa Rica and remained there.

Honors
Bozzoli, one of the founders of anthropology in Costa Rica, was the country's first woman anthropologist. In 2000, she was awarded the Bronislaw Malinowski Award, and in the following year, she was the Magón National Prize for Culture recipient. The Museo de Culturas Indígenas Doctora María Eugenia Bozzoli, in Puerto Viejo de Sarapiquí, is named in her honor.

Personal life
While studying at the University of Kansas for her Bachelor's Degree, she met the Costa Rican entomologist, and they married. Bozzoli's daughter, Leticia, attended the University of Kansas, as did Bozzoli's siblings, Ricardo, Fernando, and Virginia.

References

Bibliography

1935 births
Living people
Costa Rican anthropologists
Costa Rican women anthropologists
People from San José Province
Costa Rican people of Italian descent
Women sociologists
Academic staff of the University of Costa Rica
University of Kansas alumni
University of Georgia alumni
Costa Rican human rights activists
Costa Rican women activists
Louisiana State University faculty